{{DISPLAYTITLE:C7H6O}}
The molecular formula C7H6O (molar mass: 106.12 g/mol, exact mass: 106.0419 u) may refer to:

 Benzaldehyde, organic compound consisting of a benzene ring with a formyl substituent
 Tropone, or 2,4,6-cycloheptatrien-1-one, a non-benzenoid aromatic